Bheja Fry is an Indian Hindi language comedy film directed by Sagar Ballary and produced by Sunil Doshi. The film stars Rajat Kapoor, Vinay Pathak, Sarika, Milind Soman and Ranvir Shorey in lead roles. It released on 13 April 2007, and received favourable reviews from critics. Though made on a small budget, the film managed to do very well at the box office. This film was based on the French movie 1998 Le Dîner de Cons which was later adapted into a 2010 Hollywood film Dinner for Schmucks. It is the first installment of  the Bheja Fry trilogy.

Plot
Ranjeet Thadani (Rajat Kapoor) is a music producer married to Sheetal (Sarika) a singer. Ranjeet and his friends get together every Friday for a party. This is a different kind of party where they invite idiots to ridicule them behind the scenes and calling them "talent". They enjoy doing it so much that they don't even mind missing out on family appointments.

One of Ranjeet's friends meets Bharat Bhushan (Vinay Pathak), an inspector in the Income Tax Department, on a trip to Pune and decides that he could probably be a source of entertainment for Ranjeet. Ranjeet promptly calls Bharat and invites him for dinner.

Bharat is a talkative self-promoting singer who carries with him a scrap book showcasing his musical life. He is excited at the prospect of meeting a music producer which might help advance his career as a singer. Bharat is kind-hearted and wants to help everyone but he also has the ability to mess things up for people around him. He can be annoying to the person who is sitting next to him but he makes it a funny experience for everyone else watching him.

Friday arrives but Ranjeet's back is sprained badly and is restricted from moving around. Ranjeet knows that he will not be able to make it to the party but still decides to meet with Bharat to see how good or rather bad he is. Before Bharat arrives at Ranjeet's residence, Sheetal leaves after an altercation with Ranjeet. When Ranjeet asks Bharat to call his family doctor, he accidentally calls Ranjeet's girlfriend Suman Rao (Bhairavi Goswami). Ranjeet asks Bharat to leave his home for all the mess he has created. Ranjeet tries to get information regarding Sheetal's whereabout. Bharat offers to help and calls Sheetal's previous boyfriend Anant Ghoshal (Milind Soman) under a false identity. Instead, he ends up giving Ranjeet's Landline number that makes it obvious to Anant that Ranjeet is trying to get all details. Anant tells Ranjeet that Sheetal might have gone to Keval Arora, a sex-freak.

It turns out that a colleague of Bharat, Asif Merchant (Ranvir Shorey), who is also an inspector in the income tax department, knows the whereabouts of Keval. Asif is a snobby character who loves to watch cricket and is an ardent fan of Pakistan. While trying to mend the relationship between Ranjeet and Sheetal, Suman tells Bharat that he was called by Ranjeet to make a fool of him and have fun at his expense. This hurts Bharat, but the good-hearted Bharat still wants to help Ranjeet by letting Sheetal know how sorry Ranjeet is because of his acts and how much he loves her. However, he again messes up and the film ends on a funny note.

Cast
 Rajat Kapoor as Ranjeet Thadani
 Vinay Pathak as Bharat Bhushan
 Sarika as Sheetal Agarwal
 Ranvir Shorey as Asif Merchant
 Milind Soman as Anant Ghoshal
 Bhairavi Goswami as Suman Rao
 Tom Alter as Doctor

Music
Kaun Kiska Hua Hai Yaha - Vasundhara Das
Bacha Hai Na Koi Raha - Shaan

Remakes/Inspirations

Reception

The film received positive to average response from critics and public. At the box office, the film opened to an below average opening by collecting only 1.22 crores in its opening weekend; and lifetime collection was 8.98 crores  however, to the positive word-of-mouth the film performed better in its second weekend. Its full theatrical gross was 18 crores worldwide.

Sequel
Despite its low budget, the original Bheja Fry was a moderate success at the box office. Therefore, a sequel under the title Bheja Fry 2 released on 17 June 2011 and was filmed in Malaysia. The sequel featured Vinay Pathak reprising his role as the main lead, and the only character remaining from the original, with new cast including Minissha Lamba, Kay Kay Menon and others.

References

External links

2007 films
HandMade Films films
2000s Hindi-language films
Indian comedy films
Indian remakes of French films
Hindi films remade in other languages
Films directed by Sagar Ballary
2007 comedy films
Hindi-language comedy films